Epepeotes nitidus is a species of beetle in the family Cerambycidae. It was described by Per Olof Christopher Aurivillius in 1923, originally under the genus Diochares. It is known from Sulawesi.

References

nitidus
Beetles described in 1923